Kigoma-Ujiji District is one of the eight administrative districts of Kigoma Region in Tanzania. It is bordered to the west by Uvinza District in the south east and to the north by Kigoma District. The western shore of lake Tanganyika surrounds the district on the west.
According to the 2012 census, the district has a total population of 215,458.

Administrative subdivisions
As of 2012, Kigoma-Ujiji District was administratively divided into 19 wards.

Wards

 Bangwe
 Buhanda
 Businde
 Buzebazeba
 Gungu
 Kagera
 Kasimbu
 Kasingirima
 Katubuka
 Kibirizi
 Kigoma
 Kipampa
 Kitongoni
 Machinjioni
 Majengo
 Mwanga Kaskazini
 Mwanga Kusini
 Rubuga 
 Rusimbi

References

Districts of Kigoma Region